Thomas Henry Kendall (18 April 18391 August 1882), was an Australian author and bush poet, who was particularly known for his poems and tales set in a natural environment. He appears never to have used his first name — his three volumes of verse were all published under the name of "Henry Kendall".

Early life
Kendall was born in a settler's hut by Yackungarrah Creek in Yatte Yattah near Ulladulla, New South Wales, twin son (with Basil Edward Kendall) of Basil Kendall (1809–1852) and his wife Matilda Kendall, née McNally c. 1815, and baptised in the Presbyterian church. His father was the second son of Rev. Thomas Kendall, an Englishman who came to Sydney in 1809 and five years later went as a missionary to New Zealand, before settling in New South Wales in 1827.

Kendall has also been known as Henry Clarence Kendall, for reasons unknown (however at the age of 5, his parents moved to the Clarence River area of northern New South Wales).
Journalist and fellow poet A. G. Stephens sought to correct the confusion in 1928, publishing a pamphlet which included proof that the poet was baptised Thomas Henry Kendall, but stated the name of Henry Clarence Kendall at his wedding.

He received only a slight education.  When he was 15 he went to sea with one of his uncles on a whaling voyage and was away for about two years.

Adult life

Returning from his maritime experience to Sydney when 17-years-old, Kendall found his mother keeping a boarding-school; it was necessary that he should do something to earn a living, and he became a shop-assistant. He had begun to write verses and this brought him in contact with two well-known verse writers of the day, Joseph Sheridan Moore who published a volume of verse, Spring Life Lyrics, in 1864, and James Lionel Michael. Michael, who was a solicitor, took Kendall into his office and gave him the run of his library. He removed to Grafton in 1861 and Kendall was again employed by him for about six months during the following year.

Kendall made another friend in Henry Parkes, who was editing The Empire from 1850 to 1857 and published a few of his youthful verses. In 1862 he sent some poems to the London Athenaeum which printed three of them and gave the author kindly praise. In the same year his first volume, Poems and Songs, was published at Sydney. It was well received and eventually the whole edition of 500 copies was sold. Representations were made to the government, and in 1863 a position was found for the poet in the lands department. He was transferred to the colonial secretary's department in 1864 and appears to have discharged his duties in a conscientious way; his hours were not long and he had some leisure for literature. His salary, originally £150 a year, became increased to £250 and he was able to make a home for his mother and sisters.

In 1868 he married Charlotte Rutter, the daughter of a Sydney physician, and in the following year resigned from his position in the government service and went to Melbourne, which had become a larger city than Sydney and more of a literary centre. Kendall's decision to give up his position must at the time have seemed very unwise. But he had become financially embarrassed before his marriage on account of the extravagance of his family, and his wife found it impossible to live with his mother, who had joined the young couple. The elder Mrs Kendall was in fact practically a dipsomaniac, and the poet felt that the only chance of happiness for himself and his wife was to make a fresh start in another city. 

They travelled south to Melbourne where he was welcomed by his fellow writers, such as George Gordon McCrae, Marcus Clarke and Adam Lindsay Gordon. He and Clarke worked together to produce the short-lived satirical magazine Humbug (1869-70). Kendall, however, had none of the qualities of a successful journalist. Some of his work was accepted by the press and George Robertson published his second volume of poetry, Leaves from Australian Forests, soon after his arrival. The poem 'Bell-Birds', one of Australia's best-known poems, was published in that volume. The press notices were favourable, one reviewer in his enthusiasm going so far as to say that "Swinburne, Arnold and Morris are indulgently treated if we allow them an equal measure of poetic feeling with Kendall". Despite this, comparatively few copies were sold and the publisher made a loss.

The poet found that he could not make a living by literature and, probably by the good offices of George Gordon McCrae, a temporary position was found for him in the government statist's office. Kendall, however, had no head for figures. He did his best but found his tasks hopeless. One day McCrae was called out into the passage to see Kendall, an agitated, trembling figure who told him he must go, he could not stand it any longer. Years later Henry Lawson was to write

::"Just as in Southern climes they give
The hard-up rhymer figures!"

Kendall had indeed lost heart; he drifted into drinking and Alexander Sutherland in his essay draws a lurid picture of the depths into which the poet had fallen. It is true that he had the authority of Kendall's poem "On a Street", but years afterwards George Gordon McCrae reported that Kendall "made the worst of everything including himself". McCrae had no doubt about Kendall having at times given way to excessive drinking, but stated positively that he had never actually seen him the worse for drink. McCrae was a good friend to Kendall and he had many other friends in spite of his retiring and sensitive nature. But his friends could not save him from himself, and his two years in Melbourne were among the most miserable of his life. A pathetic letter is still in existence, in which Kendall tells McCrae that he could not go to Gordon's funeral because he was penniless. In December 1870 he was charged with forging and uttering a cheque but found not guilty on the ground of insanity. Unable to support his family, he was forced back to Sydney by poverty, ill health and drunkenness. Intervals of dogged literary effort alternated with lapses into melancholia.  His wife had to return to her mother and Kendall became a derelict; in early 1873 he spent four months in the Gladesville Hospital for the Insane. In November 1873 Kendall was taken in by the Fagan brothers, timber merchants near Gosford, and was afterwards given a position in the business of one of the brothers, Michael Fagan, at Camden Haven. There he stayed six years and found again his self-respect. Writing in October 1880 to George Gordon McCrae he said, referring to his employer, "I want you to know the bearer. He is the man who led me out of Gethsemane and set me in the sunshine".

In 1880 he published his third volume, Songs from the Mountains. It was an outstanding success, doing much to re-establish his reputation. The volume contained a satirical poem on a politician of the day and had to be withdrawn under threat of a libel action. The original edition is now very rare. The volume was reissued with another poem substituted.

Final years

In 1881 his old friend Sir Henry Parkes had him appointed inspector of state forests at a salary of £500 a year. But his health, never strong, broke down due to the required long rides in all weather. He caught a severe chill, developed consumption, and died at Redfern in Sydney on 1 August 1882. He was buried in Waverley Cemetery.  His widow survived him for more than 40 years, and during the last sixteen years of her life received a Commonwealth Literary Fund pension.

Legacy

A posthumous portrait, painted by Tom Roberts, is at the National Library of Australia, Canberra. In 1938 his son, Frederick C. Kendall published Henry Kendall, His Later Years, self-described as "A Refutation of Mrs Hamilton-Grey's book Kendall Our God-made Chief".

In 1886 a memorial edition of his poems was published at Melbourne.  A translation into German of selected poems by Henry Kendall taken from the book of his son Frederick C. Kendall appeared in 2021.

Comboyne Street in Kendall has a granitic sculpture to the poet (GPS ). 

His name is given to several locations: 

 The small village of Kendall on the Mid North Coast of New South Wales is named after him and not, as some suspect, after the similarly-spelled ancient town of Kendal in the County of Cumbria in England. 

 A street in Elwood, Victoria. 

 A street in Campbelltown, Padstow Heights, and Heathcote in New South Wales. 

 A street and a park in Tarrawanna near Wollongong, NSW.

NSW Central Coast

On the New South Wales Central Coast, a number of locations are named in his honour:

 Henry Kendall Street in West Gosford is home to the stone building (now a museum known as 'Henry Kendall Cottage') where he lived for some time with the Fagans.

 A retirement village in the nearby suburb of Wyoming is also named in his honour: Henry Kendall Gardens (formally the Henry Kendall Village).

 Henry Kendall High School (also in West Gosford).

 The biennial Henry Kendall Poetry Award, run by Central Coast Poets Inc., has been won by poets Louise Oxley, Judy Johnson and Joan Kerr.

On the hillside above West Gosford, near "Lookout – West Gosford" is a stone monument located on a tight bend of the Central Coast Highway, built sometime before 1920.  The marble plaque is inscribed:
TO KENDALL'S ROCK
There was a rock-pool in a glen
Beyond Narrara's sands;
The mountains shut it in from men
In flowerful fairy lands.

But once we found its dwelling place—
The lovely and the lone—
And, in a dream, I stopped to trace
Our names upon a stone.
Henry Kendall
R.A.H.S.

Bibliography

Poetry
 Poems and Songs (1862)
 Leaves from Australian Forests (1869)
 Songs from the Mountains (1880)
 Poems of Henry Kendall (1886)

Major individual works
 "The Glen of the White Man's Grave" (1860)
 "The Curlew Song" (1860)
 "Fainting By the Way" (1861)
 "The Barcoo : The Squatter's Song" (1862)
 "The Last of His Tribe" (1864)
 "Daniel Henry Deniehy" (1865)
 "The Voyage of Telegonus" (1866)
 "Campaspe" (1866)
 "The Warrigal" (1867)
 "Bell-Birds" (1867)
 "A Death in the Bush" (1868)
 "Moss on a Wall" (1868)
 "Rose Lorraine" (1869)
 "Prefatory Sonnets : I" (1869)
 "Prefatory Sonnets : II" (1869)
 "The Hut by the Black Swamp" (1869)
 "Aboriginal Death-Song" (1869)
 "Bush Lyrics : No. II : Camped by the Creek" (1870)
 "Song of the Shingle Splitters" (1874)
 "The Voice in the Native Oak" (1874)
 "Mooni" (1875)
 "Bill the Bullock Driver" (1876)
 "Araluen" (1879)
 "Orara" (1879)
 "Dedication : To a Mountain" (1880)
 "The Song of Ninian Melville" (1880)
 "Beyond Kerguelen" (1880)
 "Kerrassu"

Notes and references

External links 
 
 
 
 http://setis.library.usyd.edu.au/ozlit/pdf/v00009.pdf – Kendall's poetical works online at Sydney University.
 http://www.centralcoastpoets.com.au

 
1839 births
1882 deaths
Australian people of English descent
Burials at Waverley Cemetery
19th-century poets
Australian people in whaling
19th-century Australian poets
Australian foresters
19th-century deaths from tuberculosis
Tuberculosis deaths in Australia
Infectious disease deaths in New South Wales